Camden Fairview School District No. 16 (CFSD) is a public school district based in Camden, Arkansas, United States. The school district encompasses  of land including all or portions of several Ouachita County communities.

It service area includes Camden, Chidester, and Stephens, as well as a portion of Reader. In the 2013–2014 school year the district had 2,437 students.

The district is accredited by the Arkansas Department of Education (ADE) and by AdvancED.

History
The Chidester School District consolidated into the Fairview School District on July 1, 1987. The Camden School District merged into the Fairview School District on October 16, 1990.

The Arkansas Board of Education voted to dissolve the Stephens School District in April 2014. The portion in Ouachita County, including Stephens, was assigned to Camden Fairview, affecting about 140 students. Camden Fairview took ownership of the Stephens district buildings in Stephens. According to Mike McNeill of the Magnolia Reporter, the expected outcome was that the Camden Fairview district would give the Stephens school property to the Stephens city government.

Schools 
Secondary schools:
 Camden Fairview High School, serving more than 750 students in grades 9 through 12.
 Camden Fairview Middle School, serving more than 500 students in grades 6 through 8.

Elementary schools:
 Camden Fairview Intermediate School, serving more than 350 students in grades 4 and 5.
 Ivory Primary School, serving more than 350 students in grades 2 and 3.
 Fairview Elementary School, serving more than 450 students in pre-kindergarten through grade 1.

Former schools:
 Fairview Junior High School
 Chidester Elementary School
 It occupied the former Chidester Public School, a high school building, and was established in 1987. Its school facility was built in 1968.
 Whiteside Elementary School

References

Further reading
 (Download)

External links 

 
 

School districts in Arkansas
Education in Ouachita County, Arkansas